Trey Yingst (born 1993) is an American journalist who serves as a foreign correspondent for Fox News based in Jerusalem, Israel. Yingst has reported from the Gaza Strip and around the Middle East, appearing on Fox News programs.

Early life and education
Yingst was born in the Harrisburg, Pennsylvania area where he attended Central Dauphin High School. He studied at American University and received a BA in Broadcast Journalism from American University School of Communication in 2016.

Career
Yingst began his career as a journalist at the media outlet he co-founded with Ford Fischer, News2Share, while both were students at American University. While at News2Share, Yingst reported from Gaza, Ukraine, Rwanda and Uganda. Yingst was also arrested during a demonstration in Ferguson, as reported by the Los Angeles Times. The arrest was later expunged with assistance from the ACLU.

He then joined One America News Network where he served as the network's Chief White House Correspondent, covering the Trump administration for 16 months.

In 2017, his question exchange with Press Secretary Sarah Huckabee Sanders was covered in the CNN article, "An absolutely maddening exchange between Sarah Sanders and the media".

In 2018, Yingst joined Fox News’ international correspondent team.

In February 2019, Israeli troops moved Yingst and his crew during a live shot due to grenades being thrown in their direction. He has also reported amid rocket fire, some of which occurred while he was live on the air.

He was interviewed by Mediaite in March 2019. Later in 2019, he attended the White House Correspondents Dinner. Yingst was also placed on the Forbes 30 Under 30 list for Media – 2019.

In the summer of 2019, Yingst interviewed Jared Kushner in Bahrain.

In August 2019, he broke a story about an oil tanker named the Bonita Queen, smuggling Iranian oil to Syria. The tanker was sanctioned by the U.S. government two weeks after the Fox News report was published.  

In September 2019, Yingst reported exclusively on a classified Iranian base in Eastern Syria capable of storing precision guided missiles, citing Western Intelligence sources. The site was targeted 6 days later, killing a reported 21 people. 

In February 2022, Yingst reported from Kyiv, Ukraine during the Russian invasion of Ukraine.

References

1993 births
Living people
Journalists from Pennsylvania
American University alumni
People from Hershey, Pennsylvania
Fox News people